Tainara de Souza da Silva (born 21 April 1999), simply known as Tainara or sometimes Tay, is a Brazilian professional footballer who plays as a central defender for German club Bayern Munich and the Brazil women's national team.

Club career
She subsequently played for Vitória before being presented at Santos in January 2020.

A regular starter for Santos, Tainara moved to Palmeiras on 15 January 2021. Roughly one year later, she moved abroad after signing a two-and-a-half-year contract with French side Bordeaux.

International career
After representing Brazil at under-17 and under-20 sides, Tainara received her first call-up for the full side in September 2020. She made her full international debut on 18 February 2021, starting in a 4–1 SheBelieves Cup win over Argentina.

Career statistics

International

References

1999 births
Living people
Footballers from Brasília
Brazilian women's footballers
Expatriate sportspeople in Germany
Women's association football defenders
Campeonato Brasileiro de Futebol Feminino Série A1 players
Santos FC (women) players
Sociedade Esportiva Palmeiras (women) players
Division 1 Féminine players
FC Girondins de Bordeaux (women) players
Frauen-Bundesliga players
FC Bayern Munich (women) players
Brazil women's international footballers
Brazilian expatriate women's footballers
Brazilian expatriate sportspeople in France
Expatriate women's footballers in France
Brazilian expatriate sportspeople in Germany
Expatriate women's footballers in Germany